Ben Macpherson is a Scottish politician who has served as Minister for Social Security and Local Government in the Scottish Government since May 2021, having previously served as Minister for Europe, Migration and International Development (June 2018-February 2020), Minister for Public Finance and Migration (February 2020-December 2020) and Minister for Rural Affairs and the Natural Environment (December 2020-May 2021). A member of the Scottish National Party (SNP), he has been the Member of the Scottish Parliament (MSP) for the Edinburgh Northern and Leith constituency since 2016.

Early life and education
Macpherson attended Flora Stevenson Primary School and then George Heriot's School. He then graduated from the University of York with a degree in philosophy and politics. He later studied law at the University of Edinburgh.

As a youth, Macpherson was involved in the local Labour Party. When he was sixteen, he did work experience with his local MSP Malcolm Chisolm, whose constituency he later represented. He became a member of the SNP in 2005, having left Labour in 2003 due to the Iraq War and lack of progress on social inclusion.

He worked in a number of different roles and sectors, including time as a bartender, for a wave energy company and as a clerical assistant at James Gillespie's High School. He then trained as a lawyer, working for the firm Brodies.

In the summer of 2004 he walked from Edinburgh to London to raise awareness of the annual International Day of Peace. Growing up he was a keen footballer and played for several teams in Edinburgh and the University of York's 1st Team. In 2003, he lived briefly in China, working as a volunteer English teacher in Wujiang.

Political career
In August 2015, Macpherson was selected from a field of ten contenders as the SNP candidate for the Edinburgh Northern and Leith constituency, having been supported by former SNP leader Alex Salmond and Edinburgh Southern MSP Jim Eadie. Tipped as "one of the SNP’s rising stars", at the May 2016 Scottish Parliament election Macpherson won the seat with a 10% swing from Labour. He succeeded Malcolm Chisholm, who had retired.

As a backbencher, he served on the Justice Committee and the Social Security Committee, and was a Parliamentary Liaison Officer to the First Minister. On 27 June 2018, he was appointed as Minister for Europe, Migration and International Development in the Scottish Government. He served in this role until February 2020, when he became Minister for Public Finance and Migration.
In December 2020, he was appointed Minister for Rural Affairs and the Natural Environment.

Macpherson was re-elected at the 2021 Scottish Parliament election, when his constituency was the last to declare a result.  In the subsequent ministerial reshuffle, Macpherson was appointed on 19 May as Minister for Social Security and Local Government.

References

External links 
 
 Ben Macpherson profile on SNP website
 personal website

Year of birth missing (living people)
1980s births
Living people
Place of birth missing (living people)
Politicians from Edinburgh
Scottish solicitors
Alumni of the University of Edinburgh
Alumni of the University of York
Scottish National Party MSPs
Members of the Scottish Parliament 2016–2021
Members of the Scottish Parliament 2021–2026
Members of the Scottish Parliament for Edinburgh constituencies
Ministers of the Scottish Government